Romans 14 is the fourteenth chapter of the Epistle to the Romans in the New Testament of the Christian Bible. It is authored by Paul the Apostle, while he was in Corinth in the mid-50s AD, with the help of an amanuensis (secretary), Tertius, who adds his own greeting in Romans 16:22. Protestant Reformer Martin Luther summarised this chapter as Paul's teaching that "one should carefully guide those with weak conscience and spare them; one shouldn't use Christian freedom to harm, but rather to help, the weak". Lutheran theologian Johann Albrecht Bengel says that Paul "refers all things to faith".

Text
The original text was written in Koine Greek. This chapter is divided into 23 verses in most modern-day translations, but many historic Greek editions placed Romans 16:25–27 at the end of this chapter instead, making it consist of 26 verses in total.

Textual witnesses
Some early manuscripts containing the text of this chapter are:
In Greek:
Codex Vaticanus (AD 325–350)
Codex Sinaiticus (330–360)
Codex Alexandrinus (400–440)
Codex Ephraemi Rescriptus (~450; complete)
In Gothic language
Codex Carolinus (6th/7th century; extant verses 9–20)
In Latin
Codex Carolinus (6th/7th century; extant verses 9–20)

Old Testament references
 Romans 14:11 referencea Isaiah 45:23

The weak in faith
The word which Paul uses for "weakness" in faith refers to both physical illness and moral weakness. In 2 Timothy 4:20, a book traditionally ascribed to Paul, it is stated that Paul'a missionary companion Trophimus was sick when he left him at Miletus.

Verse 4 

Verse 4 is reminiscent of the teaching of Jesus Christ (and one of the most-cited biblical quotations) in Matthew 7:1: "Judge not, lest you be judged."

Verse 23 

The statement about faith in verse 23 is similar to that found in Hebrews 11:6, "...without faith it is impossible to please God."

Verses 24–26 

Verses 24–26 are not contained here in most modern-day English translations, but rather they are placed at the end of Romans 16 as verses 25–27. However, the majority of Greek manuscripts, most of which are in the Byzantine Text tradition, place these verses here at the end of Romans 14. A very small minority of other manuscripts either place them after Romans 15, place them in multiple places, or omit them altogether. Most scholars today believe that these verses belong at the end of chapter 16, but some defend the authenticity of their placement at this location.

See also
 Unclean animals
 Related Bible parts: Isaiah 45, Isaiah 49, Matthew 7

References

Bibliography

External links
 King James Bible - Wikisource
English Translation with Parallel Latin Vulgate
Online Bible at GospelHall.org (ESV, KJV, Darby, American Standard Version, Bible in Basic English)
Multiple bible versions at Bible Gateway (NKJV, NIV, NRSV etc.)

14